Judaism On Our Own Terms (JOOOT) is a national network of independent Jewish communities on college campuses in the United States. It is affiliated with Open Hillel, and was established in April 2019 motivated by opposition to Hillel International's prohibition on collaboration between campus Hillel chapters and any groups that endorse the Boycott, Divestment and Sanctions movement. JOOOT does not take a position on most political topics and does not limit the types of programming member communities can organize. Member communities are self-governed.

History 
In 2019, many JOOOT groups held Passover seders as alternatives to the ones offered by Hillel at their schools.

In September 2019, JOOOT held its second national conference. The conference took place at Brown University, with about 80 students attending from 27 different schools.

In December 2020, JOOOT produced a zine for Hanukkah after soliciting contributions from the JOOOT community on social media.

References

External links 
 

Jewish organizations based in the United States
Jewish organizations established in 2019